Sangha Ogol Leye is a village and seat of the commune of Sangha in the Cercle of Bandiagara in the Mopti Region of southern-central Mali. The village is one of a group that are located at the top of the Bandiagara Escarpment.

References

Populated places in Mopti Region
Dogon holy places